Lucy Shuker (born 28 May 1980) is a British wheelchair tennis player who is currently the highest ranked woman in the sport in Britain. A previous singles & doubles National Champion, Lucy has represented Great Britain at three successive Paralympic Games, twice winning a bronze medal in the women's doubles and is former World Doubles Champion and World Team Cup Silver Medallist amongst a number of other National and International successes.

In 2008, she competed in the singles and doubles events for the first time in Wheelchair tennis at the Beijing Paralympics.

Lucy made history at the London 2012 Paralympics alongside fellow Brit Jordanne Whiley when the pair became the first women to win a medal for Great Britain in wheelchair tennis, coming from match point down to secure Bronze in the women's doubles event.

Lucy and Jordanne retained their Bronze medal status in the Women's Wheelchair Doubles at the 2016 Paralympic Games in Rio.

Early life
Shuker was born in Doha, Qatar, but grew up in Fleet, Hampshire. Lucy comes from a talented badminton family and started played badminton at an early age before going on to represent Hampshire County at National Competitions, alongside her brother Matthew Shuker, who held a career high World ranking of No.43 in men's singles. Lucy also had a love of horse riding until she had a motorbike accident at the age of 21 which left her paralysed from the T4 vertebra.

Tennis career  
Lucy started playing wheelchair tennis in 2002, less than 12 months after her life changing motorbike accident. She was introduced to the sport by former Quad World No.#1 Pete 'Quadfather' Norfolk during the process of buying her first wheelchair.

Lucy is an inspiration to many. As a T4 Paraplegic, her injury was initially considered too profound for her to find success in wheelchair tennis. However, this has only ever served to motivate Lucy more and her previous badminton experience and strong hand-eye co-ordination has made her a natural talent. As one of the most disabled women on tour, Lucy continues to find success amongst the top players in the game.

In 2013, Lucy became the first British Wheelchair Tennis Player to compete at all 4 major Tennis Grand Slams in the same year when she competed at the US Open in New York, the same year that she obtained her highest singles ranking to date of World No.5.

In 2016, Lucy won her first Doubles Masters title, partnering Diede de Groot to the title.

In 2018, Lucy made a return to a Grand Slam final when she partnered Sabine Ellerbrock to reach the Wimbledon Doubles Final, and in 2021 she also reached the Australian Open Doubles Final with KG Montjane.

In June 2021 she and Jordanne Whiley were among six tennis players named to represent the UK at the postponed 2020 Paralympics in Tokyo.

Personal life
Lucy achieved a BSc Hons in the Science and Management of Exercise and Health from University of Surrey in 2001.

In 2011, Lucy was named the Vitalise Woman of Achievement, and collected the award from disability charity Vitalise in recognition of her achievements in the world of disabled sport.

On 8 November 2017, Lucy was awarded an Honorary Doctorate of Arts from Bournemouth University. In January 2019, Lucy and South African partner Kgothatso Montjane reached the semi-finals of the women's wheelchair doubles at the Australian Open, but were defeated by second seeds Marjolein Buis and Sabine Ellerbrock.

Notes

External links
 
 
 

1980 births
Living people
English female tennis players
British female tennis players
British wheelchair tennis players
Paralympic wheelchair tennis players of Great Britain
Paralympic medalists in wheelchair tennis
Paralympic bronze medalists for Great Britain
Medalists at the 2012 Summer Paralympics
Medalists at the 2016 Summer Paralympics
Wheelchair tennis players at the 2008 Summer Paralympics
Wheelchair tennis players at the 2012 Summer Paralympics
Wheelchair tennis players at the 2016 Summer Paralympics
Sportspeople from Taunton
People with paraplegia